The Lex building is a high-rise of government offices in the European Quarter of Brussels, Belgium. It is an annex building of the Council of the European Union (its main building is the Europa building) and is located at Rue de la Loi/Wetstraat 145.

History
Work began in 2001, with construction starting in 2004 when the old building was demolished. It was finished in 2006. The building was built and is owned by the Lex 2000 company, with the Council having long term rent on the building and the option to buy. Due to the increase in office space, Lex 2000 has had to finance renovation of nearby apartments to compensate.

It is built on the site of a private mansion, similar to the neighbouring Résidence Palace which was demolished instead of renovated in order to create a much larger modern building. Extra space for the EU institutions were needed in time for the 2004 enlargement of the European Union. At the time, the existing building, Justus Lipsius, could not be extended due to residential areas and the then existing conservation orders on the adjacent Résidence Palace (later partially demolished and renovated to become the Europa building), thus Lex became a new project to satisfy the need for more office space.

The first plans were submitted in 1988 by the company which built Espace Léopold, however they were deemed too ambitious by the local authorities. It was intended to be tall, serving as a gateway into the area together with the Charlemagne building opposite. The authorities demanded a reduction of 20 metres, giving it 15 floors instead of the planned 20, in order to preserve the visual dominance of the Berlaymont building and the Cinquantenaire arcades.

Features
There are three basement floors for technical services - though the car park was built with less than 200 spaces as it was deemed the public transport links compensated for lack of car parking spaces. The main entrance has direct links to the metro and rail stations with the ground floor being occupied by a large restaurant. The building's glass structure is intended to convey transparency, with two floors being cleared to give a more open feel inside.

See also
 Justus Lipsius building
 European Council
 Council of the European Union
 Brussels and the European Union
 Institutional seats of the European Union

References

European quarter of Brussels
Council of the European Union
Buildings and structures of the European Union